The following lists events that happened during 1960 in Laos.

Incumbents
Monarch: Savang Vatthana 
Prime Minister: 
 until 7 January: Sounthone Pathammavong
 7 January-3 June: Kou Abhay 
 3 June-15 August: Somsanith Vongkotrattana 
 15 August-30 August: vacant
 30 August-13 December: Souvanna Phouma 
 starting 13 December: Boun Oum

Events

April
24 April - 1960 Laotian parliamentary election

August
10 August - 1960 Laotian coups: Kong Le's coup

December
13-16 December - Battle of Vientiane

References

 
1960s in Laos
Years of the 20th century in Laos
Laos
Laos